Ptyoptila is a monotypic moth genus of the family Oecophoridae described by Alfred Jefferis Turner in 1946. Its only species, Ptyoptila matutinella, was described by Francis Walker in 1864. It is found in Australia, where it has been recorded from Queensland, New South Wales, the Australian Capital Territory and Victoria.

The wingspan is about 25 mm. The forewings are rusty brown, with two dark dots near the middle and shading to orange then red at the margins. The hindwings are pale brown, shading darker toward the margins.

References

Moths described in 1864
Oecophorinae
Monotypic moth genera